Hopea mengarawan is a species of flowering plant in the family Dipterocarpaceae. It is found in Indonesia, Malaysia, and Singapore.

References

mengarawan
Trees of Borneo
Trees of Malaya
Trees of Sumatra
Flora of Singapore
Critically endangered flora of Asia
Taxonomy articles created by Polbot